Joy of Man's Desiring is a Canadian docudrama film, directed by Denis Côté and released in 2014. The film explores people's relationship with work, through a staged depiction of a group of workers interacting with each other and their workplace.

The film premiered at the 2014 Berlin Film Festival, and had its Canadian premiere at the Rendez-vous Québec Cinéma.

References

External links

2014 films
Canadian docudrama films
Films shot in Quebec
Films directed by Denis Côté
French-language Canadian films
2010s Canadian films